Quyllurqucha (Quechua quyllur star qucha lake, "star lake", "star lake", also spelled Goillorcocha) is a mountain in the northern part of the Cordillera Blanca in the Andes of Peru which reaches a height of approximately . It is located in the Ancash Region, Huaylas Province, Yuracmarca District, west of Champara. It lies at a lake named Quyllurqucha.

References

Mountains of Peru
Mountains of Ancash Region